Dušan Čkrebić (Serbian Cyrillic: Душан Чкребић; 7 August 1927 – 7 April 2022) was a Serbian politician who served as the Prime Minister, President of the Assembly and President of the Socialist Republic of Serbia.

Biography
Čkrebić was born in Niš, Kingdom of Serbs, Croats and Slovenes on 7 August 1927, and he served in the 1st Proletarian Brigade of the Yugoslav Partisans during World War II.

In 1947, he began studying aeronautics in the Soviet Union, and he became the general manager of a soda factory in Lukavac in 1958. From 1974 to 1978, he served as Prime Minister of SR Serbia, and then as President of the Assembly from 1978 to 1982.

In 1982, he became a member of the Central Committee of the League of Communists of Yugoslavia.

Following Milošević's purge of the League of Communists of Serbia and unconstitutional consolidation of power within the republic in 1987, the Central Committee of the League of Communists of Yugoslavia responded by holding confidence votes in 1988. Čkrebić, widely viewed as a Milošević ally, was the only sitting member to lose his vote of no confidence; he thereafter resigned from the Committee. Milošević himself was exempt from facing a similar vote because he held leadership over the League of Communists of Serbia. Čkrebić thus retired from politics in 1990.

Čkrebić died on 7 April 2022.

References

External links

 Biography of Prime Minister Dušan Čkrebić 

1927 births
2022 deaths
Politicians from Niš
Prime Ministers of Serbia
Serbian communists
League of Communists of Serbia politicians
Recipients of the Order of St. Sava